The 1984 Eisenhower Trophy took place 30 October to 2 November at the Royal Hong Kong Golf Club in Fanling, Hong Kong. It was the 14th World Amateur Team Championship for the Eisenhower Trophy. The tournament was a 72-hole stroke play team event with 38 four-man teams. The best three scores for each round counted towards the team total.

Japan won the Eisenhower Trophy for the first time, finishing seven strokes ahead of the silver medalists, United States. The Philippines took the bronze medal, a further two strokes behind with Great Britain and Ireland finishing fourth. The United States had a poor second round, scoring 234 to Japan's 214, and were unable to catch the Japanese in the final two rounds. Luis Carbonetti, representing Argentina, and Tetsuo Sakata from Japan had the lowest individual scores, 2-under-par 286. Carbonetti had been the lowest individual scorer in 1982.

Teams
38 four-man teams contested the event.

The following table lists the players on the leading teams.

Scores

Source:

Individual leaders
There was no official recognition for the lowest individual scores.

Source:

References

External links
Record Book on International Golf Federation website 

Eisenhower Trophy
Golf tournaments in Hong Kong
Eisenhower Trophy
Eisenhower Trophy
Eisenhower Trophy
Eisenhower Trophy